Cabo San Lázaro is a cape in the municipality of Comondú, in the Mexican state of Baja California Sur.

Geography
The headland lies on a sand bar separating the Pacific Ocean from Bahía Magdalena.

It is about 12 miles (20 km) west of the town of San Carlos.

See also

References
 Cabo San Lázaro

Headlands of Mexico
Landforms of Baja California Sur
Comondú Municipality